The Embassy of Greece in Canberra is the main diplomatic mission of the Hellenic Republic in Australia, and residence of the Greek Ambassador to Australia; it is currently located in the suburb of Yarralumla, a suburb in which most of Canberra's embassies are found.

Representatives of the Hellenic Republic around Australia
Greece has an extensive diplomatic presence in Australia under the supervision of the Embassy of Greece in Canberra.

The following are the Greek diplomatic missions around Australia:

 Consulate General of Greece in Sydney
 Consulate General of Greece in Adelaide
 Consulate General of Greece in Melbourne
 Consulate of Greece in Perth

The following are the Greek non-diplomatic/honorary consulates around Australia:

 Honorary Consulate-General of Greece in Darwin
 Honorary Consulate of Greece in Newcastle
 Honorary Consulate of Greece in Tasmania
 Honorary Consulate of Greece in Brisbane

History
The embassy has been located at its current location since 1983, when the Embassy of Greece was built on a plot of land allocated to the Government of the Hellenic Republic for the purpose of housing a diplomatic mission and the Ambassador's residence.

Head of the Mission

Ambassador
The current Ambassador of Greece to Australia is Her Excellency Mrs. Ekaterini Xagorari, Ambassador Extraordinary and Plenipotentiary, a senior career diplomat appointed to her role by the President of the Hellenic Republic. Her credentials were accepted by the Governor-General of Australia at an official ceremony on 24 February 2016.

Other diplomatic staff
The current Deputy Head of Mission and Head of the Consular Office is Mr. Ioannis Ferentinos.

Embassy sections
 Political Section
 Managing relations between Greece and Australia.
 Consular Section
 Responsible for providing services to Greek citizens, as well as visa services for foreign nationals wishing to visit Greece.

See also
 Australia–Greece relations

References

Diplomatic missions in Canberra
Canberra
Australia–Greece relations